El Toro, Spanish for "the bull", may refer to:

Geography
El Toro (Mallorca), a neighbourhood in the municipality of Calvià on the island of Mallorca
El Toro, Castellón, a town in Castellón, Spain
El Toro (Jujuy), a rural municipality and village in Jujuy Province in Argentina
El Toro, Herrera, a corregimiento in Panama
El Toro, California, the name of a former town now part of the city of Lake Forest, California
Marine Corps Air Station El Toro, a decommissioned U.S. military base in Orange County, California
El Toro Y, a freeway interchange in Irvine, California
El Toro, a small town on Toas island, capital of Almirante Padilla Municipality in Zulia state, Venezuela
Rancho El Toro, a Mexican land grant in present-day Monterey County, California
El Toro Wilderness on the island of Puerto Rico

Mountains and hills
El Toro (Menorca), the highest hill in Menorca, Spain
El Toro (Sierra de Luquillo), a peak in the El Yunque National Forest in Puerto Rico
Cerro El Toro, a mountain in the Andes on the border between Argentina and Chile
Cerro El Toro (Upata), a mountain on the northwest side of Upata, Venezuela
Pico El Toro, a mountain in the Andes of Venezuela
El Toro, a peak in Nuevo León, Mexico noted for the rock climb El Sendero Luminoso

People and characters
El Toro (nickname), a list of people
El Toro Fuerte, a Jackie Chan Adventures character

Roller coasters

El Toro (Six Flags Great Adventure), a wooden roller coaster at Six Flags Great Adventure in New Jersey, USA
El Toro (Freizeitpark Plohn), a wooden roller coaster at Freizeitpark Plohn in Germany

Other uses
El Toro (dinghy), a class of sailing dinghy
El Toro, a custom car, winner of the 1976 Ridler Award
El Toro High School, a high school in Lake Forest, California
El Toro Hydroelectric Plant in Bío-Bío Region, Chile
El Toro Road, also called County Route S18 (CR S18)
Battle of El Toro, during the Chilean War of Independence

See also
Toro (disambiguation)
El Torito (disambiguation)